Félix Fernández Salcines (born 23 May 1964) is a Spanish water polo player. He competed in the men's tournament at the 1984 Summer Olympics.

Notes

References

External links
 

1961 births
Living people
Spanish male water polo players
Olympic water polo players of Spain
Water polo players at the 1984 Summer Olympics
Place of birth missing (living people)